The Parishes of Venezuela are the third-level administrative units of Venezuela. The Municipalities of Venezuela are divided into parishes. There are more than 1,100 parishes in Venezuela.